The 1985 Women's World Snooker Championship was a women's snooker tournament that took place in October 1985 at Breaks Snooker Club, Solihull. The competition was sponsored by First Leisure and Mitchells & Butlers and attracted 78 entrants. It was the 1985 edition of the World Women's Snooker Championship, first held in 1976.

The tournament was won by Allison Fisher, who lost only one  during the event and defeated Stacey Hillyard 5–1 in the final. Fisher received £1,250 prize money for her win. This was Fisher's first world snooker title, and she would go on to win a total of seven championships before focusing her efforts on pool in the United States from 1995.

Main draw 
The results of the semi-finals and final are shown below.

References 

1985 in English sport
1985 in snooker
1985 in women's sport
October 1985 sports events in the United Kingdom
International sports competitions hosted by England
1985